A temptation is an act that looks appealing to an individual.

Temptation may also refer to:

Film 
 Temptation (1915 film), directed by Cecil B. DeMille
 Temptation (1929 film), a French silent film
 Temptation (1934 film), a British-French musical comedy film
 Temptation (1935 film), an American drama film
 Temptation (1946 film), an American drama film noir
 Temptation (1959 film), a French drama film
 Temptation (1968 film), an Italian film of 1968
 Temptation (2004 film), a 2004 film musical
 Temptation: Confessions of a Marriage Counselor, a 2013 film

Television 
 Temptation (1967 American game show)
 Temptation (Australian game show), revival of the Reg Grundy Sale of the Century franchise
 Temptation (2007 U.S. game show), based on the Grundy version of Sale of the Century
 The Temptations (miniseries), a 1998 NBC television miniseries about the Motown singing group
 Temptation (2003 film), Australian TV movie
 Temptation (2014 TV series), a South Korean television series
 "Temptation", TV series episode of Code Lyoko, see list of Code Lyoko episodes
 Temptation, a pricing game on The Price Is Right

Literature 
 Temptation of Christ, a passage from the New Testament
 Temptation (novella), a story by David Brin
 Temptation (play), a Faustian play written by Czech playwright Václav Havel in 1985

Music 
 The Temptations, a U.S. Motown group
 The Temptations (New York vocal group), an earlier US group best known for their 1960 hit "Barbara"

Albums 
 Temptation (Holly Cole album), 1995
 Temptation (Harisu album), 2001
 Temptation (Monrose album), 2006
 Temptation (Shelby Lynne album), 1993
 Temptation (Brenda K. Starr album), 2002
 Temptation – The Best of Heaven 17, 1999
 Temptation (Emigrate album), 2008

Songs 
 "Temptation" (Nacio Herb Brown and Arthur Freed song), 1933, covered by Perry Como. the Everly Brothers and others
 "Temptation" (Heaven 17 song), 1983
 "Temptation" (New Order song), 1982
 "Temptation", a song by Elvis Costello & The Attractions from the 1980 album Get Happy!!
 "Temptation", a song by Prince from the 1985 album Around the World in a Day
 "Temptation", a song by Tom Waits from the 1987 album Franks Wild Years
 "Temptation" (Wet Wet Wet song), 1988
 "Temptation" (Corina song), 1991
 "Temptations" (song), a 1995 song by 2Pac
 "Temptation" (The Tea Party song), 1997
 "Temptation" (Arash song), 2005
 "Temptation" (Emigrate song), 2007
 "Temptation", a song by P-Square from the 2005 album Get Squared
 "Temptation", a song by Godsmack from IV
 "Temptation", a song by Destiny's Child from the 1999 album The Writing's on the Wall

Sports 
 Los Angeles Temptation, a team in the Lingerie Football League